C28 is an untarred road in central Namibia.

Roads in Namibia
Khomas Region
Erongo Region